This is a list of the largest shopping centres in the United Kingdom, listed by retail size in square metres (m2). Some of these are out-of-town centres, while others are part of a city or town centre shopping district, which in almost all cases also includes many stores not part of the shopping centre. Many city and town centre shopping districts not represented in this list are larger than some of the centres listed.

See also

List of shopping centres in the United Kingdom
List of the world's largest shopping malls
List of largest shopping malls in Canada
List of largest shopping malls in the United States
Impact of the Covid-19 pandemic on retail

Notes

References
Citations

Shopping centres in the United Kingdom
Shopping Centres by Size